Fourth is the fourth studio album by the rock band Soft Machine, released in 1971. The album is also titled Four or 4 in the USA.

Overview
The numeral "4" is the title as shown on the cover in all countries, but a written-out title appears on the spine and label. This was the group's first all-instrumental album, although their previous album Third had almost completed the band's move in this direction toward instrumental jazz, and a complete abandonment of their original self-presentation as a psychedelic pop group, or progressive rock group. It was also the last of their albums to include drummer and founding member Robert Wyatt who afterwards left. He had already recorded a solo album, The End of an Ear (in which he described himself on the cover as an "Out of work pop singer currently on drums with Soft Machine"), and now founded a new group, Matching Mole, whose name was a pun on "Soft Machine" as pronounced in French: "Machine Molle".

Like the previous Soft Machine album, some tracks have the band augmented by additional musicians. These include Mark Charig and Nick Evans, who had been in the septet lineup of late 1969, and Roy Babbington, who would join the band in 1973.

In 1999, Soft Machine albums Fourth and Fifth were re-released together on one CD.

In 2007, Fourth was re-released as part of the series Soft Machine Remastered – The CBS Years 1970–1973.

The booklets of these re-releases contain liner notes written by Mark Powell from Esoteric Recordings about the history of Soft Machine, their musical development and as one of the first relevant bands in the so-called  progressive rock scene.

Track listing
All compositions by Hugh Hopper except where indicated.

Side one
"Teeth" (Mike Ratledge) – 9:15
"Kings and Queens" – 5:02
"Fletcher's Blemish" (Elton Dean) – 4:35

Side two
"Virtually Part 1" – 5:16
"Virtually Part 2" – 7:09
"Virtually Part 3" – 4:33
"Virtually Part 4" – 3:23

Personnel 
Soft Machine
 Elton Dean – alto saxophone, saxello
 Mike Ratledge – acoustic piano, Hohner Pianet electric piano, Lowrey organ
 Hugh Hopper – bass guitar, fuzz bass
 Robert Wyatt – drums

Additional personnel
 Roy Babbington – double bass (1, 3, 4, 6)
 Mark Charig – cornet (2, 3, 4)
 Nick Evans – trombone (1, 2, 4)
 Jimmy Hastings – alto flute (6), bass clarinet (1, 6)
 Alan Skidmore – tenor saxophone (1, 6)

References

External links 
 Soft Machine - Fourth (1971) album review by Ken Taylor, credits & releases at AllMusic
 Soft Machine - Fourth (1971) album releases & credits at Discogs
 Soft Machine - Fourth (1971) album credits & user reviews at ProgArchives.com
 Soft Machine - Fourth (1971) album to be listened on Spotify
 Soft Machine - Fourth (1971) album to be listened on YouTube

Soft Machine albums
1971 albums
CBS Records albums
Columbia Records albums
Albums produced by Hugh Hopper
Albums produced by Mike Ratledge
Esoteric Recordings albums
Albums produced by Robert Wyatt
Albums produced by Elton Dean